The Victorino Cunha Cup is an annual Angolan basketball tournament held in honour of former Angolan basketball coach Victorino Cunha. The 6th edition (2014), took place at the Pavilhão da Cidadela, from October 13 to 18, 2014  and was contested by four local teams and included for the first time a foreign team. The tournament, played in a round robin system was won by Primeiro de Agosto.

Schedule

Day 1

Day 2

Day 3

Day 4

Day 5

Final standings

Awards

See also
 2014 BAI Basket
 2014 Angola Basketball Cup
 2014 Angola Basketball Super Cup

References

Victorino Cunha Cup seasons
Victorino